Arsim Rexhepi (born 20 May 1972) is a politician in Kosovo. He served in the Assembly of the Republic of Kosovo from 2008 to 2010, initially as a member of the New Kosovo Alliance (Aleanca Kosova e Re, AKR) and later with the Democratic League of Kosovo (Lidhja Demokratike e Kosovës, LDK). He is now a member of Vetëvendosje.

Early life and career
Rexhepi was born in Vushtrri, in what was then the Socialist Autonomous Province of Kosovo in the Socialist Republic of Serbia, Socialist Federal Republic of Yugoslavia. Raised in Vushtrri, he studied at the Faculty of Albanian Architecture and Literature at the University of Pristina (presumably in this context referring to the parallel institution that operated in the 1990s), and took doctoral studies at Ruhr University Bochum in Germany. He has published widely in his field.
Until 2021, Rexhepi taught German, Philosophy and Social Studies at the Montessori Gesamtschule in Sendenhorst, Germany.

Politician
Rexhepi became a vice-president of the AKR in 2006 and appeared on the party's electoral list in the 2007 Kosovan parliamentary election, which was held under open list proportional representation. He finished in seventh place and was elected when the list won thirteen mandates. The party served in opposition when the assembly convened in January 2008.

He left the AKR later in 2008 and initially sat as an independent. He joined the LDK, which was part of Kosovo's coalition government, the following year. In the assembly, Rexhepi was the chair of the committee on education, science, technology, culture, youth, and sports. He was also the chair of Kosovo's assembly friendship group with Germany. In 2009, he was identified as one of the most active members of the legislature.

In 2009, Rexhepi introduced a motion to investigate the finances of Radio Television of Kosovo (RTK). The motion was not approved by the assembly. He was not a candidate in the 2010 assembly election.

Rexhepi joined Vetëvendosje in October 2018. He was included on the party's list in the 2019 assembly election but received the fewest votes of any party candidate and was not elected. He was later the party's candidate for mayor of Vushtrri in the 2021 Serbian local elections and finished third.

Electoral record

Local

Notes

References

1972 births
Living people
Kosovo Albanians
Politicians from Pristina
People from Vushtrri
Members of the Assembly of Kosovo (UNMIK mandate until 2008)
Members of the Assembly of the Republic of Kosovo
New Kosovo Alliance politicians
Democratic League of Kosovo politicians
Vetëvendosje politicians